Carlos McKinney (born January 10, 1973), known professionally as Los Da Mystro, is an American record producer and jazz pianist.

Biography 

McKinney was born into a prominent Detroit jazz family; he is a nephew to pianist Harold McKinney, bassist Ray McKinney, trombonist Bernard McKinney (Kiane Zawadi), and drummers Earl McKinney and Walter Harris. He is a cousin to drummer Ali Jackson and trumpeter Khalil Jackson. His mother, Carolyn McKinney, is a singer, and sister Shani McKinney is a pianist. His younger sister Thema "Tayma Loren" McKinney is an aspiring solo vocalist.

McKinney began studying piano at age four with his uncle Harold; his first professional appearances were with the R&B group Identity Band when he was 12. He studied classical music at the Center for Creative Studies from 1983 to 1991. He also studied harp under Patricia Terry-Ross of the Detroit Symphony Orchestra. After studying with Harold and Ray McKinney and Marcus Belgrave, he played with the Legacy Quintet (1989–93) and then attended The New School in New York City (1991–95). He played with Winard Harper (1992–93), Antonio Hart (1992–95), Buster Williams (1993), Wallace Roney (1994–96), Sonny Rollins, Elvin Jones, Steve Turre, Branford Marsalis, Wynton Marsalis, Roy Hargrove, Kenny Garrett and Charnett Moffett. He has played jazz festivals in Europe (from 1992), Senegal (1994), Iceland (1995), and Turkey (1997). His first album as a bandleader was Up-Front (Sirocco Jazz, 2000)

McKinney has worked as an arranger and record producer. He was assistant composer to James Mtume for the TV show New York Undercover from 1995. He then received a contract from Def Jam, where he worked with musicians such as NIKKO, Case, Keithian, Ciara, Rihanna, Mariah Carey, Whitney Houston, Montell Jordan, Kandace Love, Babyface, and Redman.

He has also produced for artists such as The-Dream, J. Holiday, Bobby Valentino, and Jamie Foxx. He produced the hits "Shawty Is Da Shit" by The-Dream, "Bed" by J. Holiday and "I Invented Sex" by Trey Songz featuring Drake in 2009.

In 2013, he won a Grammy Award for his credits and production on the album Unapologetic by Rihanna.

In 2018, Los started working with The-Dream for upcoming Radio Killa Records artist Bria Jhane on her debut album titled "What is Love?".

In early 2019, Carlos contributed with Hitmaka for Chris Brown's "Indigo" album on the song "Sorry Enough". The album was certified gold by the Recording Industry Association of America (RIAA) for combined sales and album-equivalent units of over 500,000 units in the United States.

Discography

As leader 
 2000: Up-Front

As sideman 
 1993: Atymony, Bill Saxton
 1993: For Cannonball & Woody, Antonio Hart
 1994: I'm Glad There Is You: A Tribute to Carmen McRae, Vanessa Rubin
 1994: It's All Good, Antonio Hart
 1995: The Wallace Roney Quintet, Wallace Roney
 1996: Shades of Blue, Bob Belden
 1997: Kaelyn, Kaelyn
 1998: Somewhere Along the Way, Buster Williams
 1998: Joined at the Hip Buster Williams (TCB)
 1999: The Truth: Heard Live at the Blue Note, Elvin Jones (Half Note, 1999)
 2002: Groove at Jazz Entete, Ali Muhammed Jackson

Credits as composer 
With The-Dream
 2007: Love/Hate
 2009: Love vs Money
 2009: Walkin' on the Moon
 2009: My Love
 2010: Love King
 2013: IV Play
 2018: Ménage à Trois: Sextape Vol. 1, 2, 3

With others
 2005: Encore et Encore, Assia
 2007: Bed, J. Holiday
 2007: You, Chris Brown
 2008: Can't Find the Words, Karina
 2008: First Love, Karina
 2008: 6 in the Morning, Sean Garrett
 2008: Turbo 919, Sean Garrett
 2008: Intuition, Jamie Foxx
 2008: Trading Places, Usher
 2008: Uncle Charlie, Charlie Wilson
 2009: Battlefield, Jordin Sparks
 2009: D.N.A., Mario
 2009: Love and Life, Rated R
 2009: Memoirs of an Imperfect Angel, Mariah Carey
 2009: Ready, Trey Songz
 2009: The Rebirth, Bobby V
 2009: Untitled, R. Kelly
 2009: How to be a Lady: Volume 1, Electrik Red
 2010: Back to Me, Fantasia
 2010: Love Me Back, Jazmine Sullivan
 2010: Only One Flo, Pt. 1, Flo Rida
 2010: Still Standing, Monica
 2011: 4, Beyoncé
 2011: Future History, Jason Derulo
 2012: The MF Life, Melanie Fiona
 2012: Unapologetic, Rihanna
 2012: Woman to Woman, Keyshia Cole
 2013: Talk a Good Game, Kelly Rowland
 2017:  Summer Body, The-Dream
 2017:  It's Yo Birthday, The-Dream
 2018: Head over Heels, Chromeo
 2018: Ménage à Trois: Sextape Vol. 1, 2, 3, The-Dream
 2019: What is Love?, Bria Jhane
 2019: Indigo, Chris Brown
 2021: "Automatic", TeeFlii

Singles

References 

Leonard Feather and Ira Gitler, The Biographical Encyclopedia of Jazz. Oxford, 1999, p. 453.

1973 births
Living people
American jazz pianists
American male pianists
Musicians from Detroit
Record producers from Michigan
Jazz musicians from Michigan
21st-century American pianists
21st-century American male musicians
American male jazz musicians